Ilya Petrovich Chizhevsky (born February 5, 1978) is a Russian businessman. He graduated from St. Petersburg Institute of Fine Mechanics and Optics in 2000. He has been President of the Russian subsidiary of OTP Bank since 2015. In 2017, the Kommersant Newspaper mentioned him among "Top 1000 Russian managers".

References

External links 
 Ilya Chizhevsky’s biography at the website of OTP Bank 
 Ilya Chizhevskiy (Bloomberg profile)

Russian bankers
1978 births
Living people
21st-century Russian businesspeople